Coleophora spumosella is a moth of the family Coleophoridae. It has a disjunct distribution and is found in France, Switzerland, Spain, Italy, Croatia and southern Russia.

The larvae feed on Astragalus, Dorycnium pentaphyllum, Medicago and Ononis species. They create a black pistol case with a large transparent-white pallium that leaves a small part of the case uncovered. The mouth angle is about 45°. Larvae can be found from autumn to April.

References

spumosella
Moths of Europe
Moths described in 1859